The 2020 Ziolkowski, Pytlasinski, Poland Open, was an amateur wrestling event held in Warsaw, Poland between 2 and 8 November 2020. The event consisted of three competitions: the Waclaw Ziolkowski Memorial (men's freestyle wrestling), Wladyslaw Pytlasinski Cup (men's Greco-Roman wrestling) and Poland Open (women's wrestling).

Event videos
The event was air freely on the SportZona YouTube channel.

Medal table

Team ranking

Medal overview

Men's freestyle (Waclaw Ziolkowski Memorial)

Men's Greco-Roman (Wladyslaw Pytlasinski Cup)

Women's freestyle (Poland Open)

Participating nations

205 competitors from 17 nations participated.
 (69)
 (47)
 (5)
 (2)
 (21)
 (4)
 (16)
 (4)
 (4)
 (4)
 (1)
 (2)
 (7)
 (1)
 (1)
 (12)
 (5)

References

External links 
 Results Book

Wladyslaw Pytlasinski
2020 in sport wrestling
International wrestling competitions hosted by Poland
Sports competitions in Warsaw